Baldomir is a surname. Notable people with the surname include:

Alfredo Baldomir (1884–1948), Uruguayan soldier, architect and politician
Carlos Baldomir (born 1971), Argentine boxer

See also 
Floyd Mayweather Jr. vs. Carlos Baldomir, boxing match for the World Boxing Council and The Ring (magazine)